Wayne Frye (November 30, 1930 – February 26, 2014) from Manchester, Ohio was an American competition rower and Olympic champion. He won a gold medal in coxed eights at the 1952 Summer Olympics, as a member of the American team.

He graduated from the United States Naval Academy in 1954 and became a military officer (US Air Force). He participated in combat in the Vietnam war where he commanded the 555th squadron known as the Triple Nickel, flew 266 combat missions and received the Purple Heart. Following his service in Vietnam, he played at several amateur soccer clubs in the United States, Mexico and Brazil. In October 2012, Fyre was inducted in the Kentucky Aviation Hall of Fame. He died in February 2014.

References

1930 births
2014 deaths
Rowers at the 1952 Summer Olympics
Olympic gold medalists for the United States in rowing
American male rowers
Medalists at the 1952 Summer Olympics
People from Manchester, Ohio